Sørlandet Hospital Kristiansand (Norwegian:Sørlandet Sykehus Kristiansand) is located in Kristiansand, Vest-Agder County in Norway, and is one of the three public hospitals within the Hospital of Southern Norway and is a regional hospital. It was previously called Kristiansand Sentralsykehus and was located in Tordenskjoldsgate in Kvadraturen (the city center).

The departments of general medicine and psychiatry were merged into one unit after the move.

The hospital has modern facilities and is centralized geographically with full clinical, surgical, medical and psychiatric procedures and treatment-related deals.  The hospital offers both  emergency medical care and outpatient treatment.

There are maternity clinic, psychiatric treatment and inpatient care, substance abuse- and addiction treatment and an ambulance station and helipad at Eg. Mental Health Clinic - psychiatry and addiction treatment has limited psychiatric treatment for adults in Kristiansand and Arendal.

At Sørlandet Hospital Kristiansand are also numerous administrative and operational support services for the hospital trust.

References

External links
Official pages 

Kristiansand
Hospital buildings completed in 1989
Hospitals in Norway